Ovenna simulans is a moth of the subfamily Arctiinae. It was described by Paul Mabille in 1878. It is found in Angola, Cameroon, the Democratic Republic of the Congo and South Africa.

References

Lithosiini
Moths described in 1878